Kobophenol A is a stilbenoid. It is a tetramer of resveratrol. It can be isolated from Caragana chamlagu, from Caragana sinica and from Carex folliculata seeds.

The molecule shows a 2,3,4,5-tetraaryltetrahydrofuran skeleton.

It has been shown to inhibit acetylcholinesterase.

Acid-catalyzed epimerization of kobophenol A to carasinol B can be performed in vitro.

References 

Resveratrol oligomers
Natural phenol tetramers
Acetylcholinesterase inhibitors